Matilda Dodge Wilson (née Rausch; October 19, 1883 – September 19, 1967), was born Matilda Rausch in Walkerton, Ontario, Canada. Ranked as one of the wealthiest women in the world, Dodge-Wilson was the widow of John Francis Dodge, who co-founded the Dodge motor car company in Detroit with his brother Horace Elgin Dodge. She co-founded the Oakland campus of Michigan State University, now Oakland University, with her husband Alfred Wilson, and John A. Hannah. The new university was built on her  estate, Meadow Brook Farms.

Biography
Matilda Rausch was born to German immigrants in Walkerton, Ontario, Canada. She attended public school in Detroit and then attended and graduated from the Gorsline Business College in the same city. In 1902, she began working for the Dodge Motor Company and five years later, she married founder John Dodge.

After Dodge's death in 1920, Matilda inherited his share of the Dodge Brothers Company and became one of the wealthiest women in the United States. Soon thereafter, she met lumber baron Alfred G. Wilson at the First Presbyterian Church in Detroit and they married June 29, 1925. Upon Alfred Wilson's death on April 6, 1962, Matilda again received the bulk of her husband's estate. 

Matilda and John Dodge had three children, Frances (1914–1971), Daniel (1917–1938) and Anna Margaret (1919–1924). In addition, she was stepmother to John's three children from his first marriage (one of whom was Isabel Dodge Sloane). Matilda and Alfred Wilson adopted two children, Richard and Barbara.

Political career
Wilson, a Republican, was appointed the 43rd lieutenant governor of Michigan in 1940. She was the first woman to serve as Lieutenant Governor of a U.S. state. She was preceded by Luren Dickinson, Republican, and followed by Frank Murphy, Democrat.

Meadow Brook Hall and Music Hall

She was the author of A Place in the Country, a guidebook to her home, Meadow Brook Hall. In it she takes the reader through the mansion and introduces the reader to her art collection which includes works by Sir Joshua Reynolds, Thomas Gainsborough, Gilbert Stuart, George Romney, Frederic Remington, Émile van Marcke, Rosa Bonheur, Justus Sustermans and Louis Betts. 

During the later 1920s, Wilson hired the Detroit architectural firm of Smith Hinchman & Grylls to design two of the Detroit area's notable buildings, Music Hall Center for the Performing Arts (1928) and Meadow Brook Hall (1929). Both were designed by William Kapp and both included architectural sculpture by Detroit sculptor Corrado Parducci.

Final resting place
In 1939, Matilda and Alfred Wilson had constructed a pale granite Art Deco style mausoleum in Woodlawn Cemetery, designed by New York architect William Henry Deacy and again, featuring sculpture by Corrado Parducci. It is located near the south wall of the Dodge family mausoleum where her first husband was interred in 1920.

See also
 Meadow Brook Hall
 List of female lieutenant governors in the United States

References

People from Bruce County
1883 births
1967 deaths
Oakland University people
Lieutenant Governors of Michigan
Michigan Republicans
Women in Michigan politics
Women state constitutional officers of Michigan
Burials at Woodlawn Cemetery (Detroit)
20th-century American politicians
20th-century American women politicians